Hermann von Gehrden, O.P. (died 1471) was a Roman Catholic prelate who served as Auxiliary Bishop of Mainz (1431–1471) and Titular Bishop of Citrus (1431–1471).

Biography
Hermann von Gehrden was ordained a priest in the Order of Preachers. On 26 Mar 1431, he was appointed during the papacy of Pope Eugene IV as Auxiliary Bishop of Mainz and Titular Bishop of Citrus. He died on 9 Nov 1471 in Warburg, Germany.

References

External links and additional sources
 (for Chronology of Bishops) 
 (for Chronology of Bishops)  
 (for Chronology of Bishops) 
 (for Chronology of Bishops)  

15th-century Roman Catholic bishops in the Holy Roman Empire
Bishops appointed by Pope Eugene IV
1471 deaths
Dominican bishops